Adagrasib, sold under the brand name Krazati, is an anticancer medication used to treat non-small cell lung cancer. Adagrasib is an inhibitor of the RAS GTPase family. It is taken by mouth. It is being developed by Mirati Therapeutics.

The most common adverse reactions include diarrhea, nausea, fatigue, vomiting, musculoskeletal pain, hepatotoxicity, renal impairment, dyspnea, edema, decreased appetite, cough, pneumonia, dizziness, constipation, abdominal pain, and QTc interval prolongation. The most common laboratory abnormalities include decreased lymphocytes, increased aspartate aminotransferase, decreased sodium, decreased hemoglobin, increased creatinine, decreased albumin, increased alanine aminotransferase, increased lipase, decreased platelets, decreased magnesium, and decreased potassium.

It was approved for medical use in the United States in December 2022.

Medical uses 
Adagrasib is indicated for the treatment of adults with KRAS G12C-mutated locally advanced or metastatic non-small cell lung cancer (NSCLC), as determined by an FDA approved test, who have received at least one prior systemic therapy.

History 
Approval by the US Food and Drug Administration (FDA) was based on KRYSTAL-1, a multicenter, single-arm, open-label clinical trial (NCT03785249) which included participants with locally advanced or metastatic non-small cell lung cancer with KRAS G12C mutations. Efficacy was evaluated in 112 participants whose disease has progressed on or after platinum-based chemotherapy and an immune checkpoint inhibitor, given either concurrently or sequentially.

The FDA granted the application for adagrasib fast-track, breakthrough therapy, and orphan drug designations.

Research 
It is undergoing clinical trials.

References

External links 
 
 

Antineoplastic drugs
Breakthrough therapy
Piperazines
Orphan drugs